Wings for the Eagle (aka Shadow of Their Wings) is a 1942 American drama film starring Ann Sheridan, Dennis Morgan, Jack Carson and George Tobias, directed by Lloyd Bacon. It tells the story of workers at a Lockheed aircraft assembly plant in the months preceding the attack on Pearl Harbor. It was the first of 11 films in which Morgan and Carson appeared together, though they did not become known as a movie "team" until a few years later.

Plot
In 1940, Corky Jones (Dennis Morgan) and Gil Borden (Don DeFore) come to Burbank, California, looking for jobs. They get work at the Lockheed  aircraft factory.  Corky stays with his friend Brad Maple (Jack Carson) and his wife Roma (Ann Sheridan) Brad is unemployed.

At work, Corky befriends Jake Hanso (George Tobias) and his son Pete (Russell Arms). Pete is studying to become a military pilot. Corky rents a room from Jake after Brad becomes jealous of him. Jake is a supervisor at the plant, born abroad, who loses his job because he is not a citizen.

Roma leaves Brad. Corky begins dating Roma, and the two men fight over her, creating a  romantic triangle. When the Japanese launch a sneak attack on Pearl Harbor, Pete reports for service. He is killed in action.

Corky joins the military as an air cadet, and he arranges for Roma and Brad to get back together. On an early mission his plane shoots down a Japanese fighter, avenging Pete's death.

Cast

Production
Wings for the Eagle, originally titled Shadow of Their Wings was partly set in Burbank, California near the Lockheed Corporation which had built a production facility where 45 buildings spread out over 550 acres. Warner Bros. received permission to shoot at the Lockheed plant, but, for security reasons, the film crew and actors were instructed to keep a birth certificate on them at all times. The original casting had Ronald Reagan co-starring with Dennis Morgan but he was replaced by Morgan and Jack Carson became the "sidekick".

Warner Bros. advertised the connection with Lockheed in a full-page ad in Life magazine, dedicating the film, "to the workers who actually build Wings for the Eagle. To the workers of America's Fighting aircraft industry ... men and women devoted to the new gospel "We can! We must! We Will!" 

Wings for the Eagle was churned out quickly between January 12–February 1942 at both the Lockheed plant and the Curtiss-Wright Aircraft Company in Buffalo, New York, using a near-documentary film style. At the conclusion of the production, Sheridan, Morgan and Carson went on war bond tours together. Later, Morgan and Carson would visit hospitals and camps throughout the South Pacific during the war.

Aviation film historian Stephen Pendo in Aviation in the Cinema (1985) described how Wings for the Eagle benefited from its association with Lockheed, especially being able to photograph the ceremony highlighting the rollout of the 2,000th aircraft produced for the war effort. An interesting anecdote involved "Billy Curtis, a midget, who showed one way of solving a fuselage construction problem."

Reception
The New York Times called Wings for the Eagle "a rather substantial and satisfying film," but said it "doesn't have the tight construction of its planes and it lacks some of the flaring excitement of films devoted mainly to scenes of air combat." The Los Angeles Times said the film won't make motion picture history but "is a satisfactory enough passing event, important now."

References

Notes

Citations

Bibliography

 Beck, Simon D. The Aircraft-Spotter's Film and Television Companion. Jefferson, North Carolina: McFarland & Company, 2016. .
 Paris, Michael. From the Wright Brothers to Top Gun: Aviation, Nationalism, and Popular Cinema. Manchester, UK: Manchester University Press, 1995. .
 Pendo, Stephen. Aviation in the Cinema. Lanham, Maryland: Scarecrow Press, 1985. .

External links
 
 
 
 

1942 films
1942 romantic drama films
American aviation films
American black-and-white films
American romantic drama films
American World War II propaganda films
Films directed by Lloyd Bacon
Films scored by Friedrich Hollaender
Films set in 1940
Films set in 1941
Films set in California
Warner Bros. films
1940s English-language films